Yukiko Kai (Kai Yukiko, 21 September 1954 - 12 December 1980)  was a Japanese shōjo manga artist. Her real name was Kimiko Kaihatsu (Kaihatsu Kimiko). She is considered a member of the Post Year 24 Group. Although she died young, her works are still analyzed. Manga artist Akiko Hatsu is her younger sister.

Biography 
Born in Kanazawa, Ishikawa prefecture, Kai graduated from a high school and entered a company where she worked for one year. She joined the manga coterie magazine Ravuri which her friend Yasuko Sakata operated when she was in high school. In 1973, she went to Tokyo and became a manga assistant of Moto Hagio, and lived in Hagio's house.

Kai debuted in the Spring issue of Bessatsu Viva Princess (the first issue of this magazine) in Akita Shoten for her work Anasutashia no Sutekina Otonari (Nice Next-door Neighbor of Anastasia). She published the stories of the "Shiki series" (Seasons series) and the "Anastasia series" in the magazine Gekkan Princess and Bonita.

In 1979, when Moto Hagio, Aiko Itō, Yukiko Kai, Akiko Jō and Shio Satō visited the Europe, they participated in the 37th Worldcon, Seacon '79 at Brighton, United Kingdom. 

After published Ryokuin Kōro in the Summer issue of Bessatsu Viva Princess in 1980, Kai spent time under medical treatment at a hospital in Kanazawa city. She died on 12 December 1980 of stomach cancer at a hospital in Kanazawa.

The story which was contributed to the collaboration manga Kyōdai Jingi is her last work.

Style of works 
Kai read Japanese fantastic novels and works such as those by Tatsuhiko Shibusawa, Hideo Nakai (JA) and Kunio Tsukamoto (JA) etc. She was largely affected by these fantastic works. Kai wrote various genres of manga stories. But she loved Fantasy and Science fiction. Many of her works are classified in these genres.

Works

Princess comics 
There are nine books of Yukiko Kai published by Akita Shoten.

Akita bunko 
There are six bunkobon books of Yukiko Kai published by Akita Shoten. In this bunkobon version, even if the title of book is same as that of Princess comics version, the stories contained are different.

Others

See also 
 Moto Hagio - Kai was her assistant. Kai was influenced by Hagio's works.
 Yasuko Sakata - Kai's friend since high school.
 Akiko Hatsu - The younger sister of Kai. Hatsu was at one point Kai's assistant. Closely following Kai's death, Akiko Hatsu made her debut as a manga artist. The pseudonyms "Yukiko Kai" and "Akiko Hatsu" come from their real surname (Kaihatsu).

Notes and references

References 
 (ja) Masao Azuma & Ran Ishidō Nihon Gensō Sakka Jiten, Kokusho Kankokai, (2009),  p. 825
 (ja) alisato.web "Hana ni Nemure" Retrieved 14 October 2019.
 (ja) Daisukidatta! Shōjo manga, '70-nendai-hen, 23 July 2014, Akita Shoten,

External links 
  alisato.web "Hana ni Nemure", fan-site

1954 births
1980 deaths
Manga artists
People from Kanazawa, Ishikawa
Japanese women artists
20th-century Japanese women artists